"Weirdo" is a song by English band the Charlatans. It was released as the first single from the band's second album, Between 10th and 11th, on 24 February 1992, reaching  19 on the UK Singles Chart. The single was the band's most successful in the United States, peaking at No. 1 on the Billboard Modern Rock Tracks chart in May 1992 and No. 10 on the Billboard Hot Dance Club Play Singles chart.

Track listings
All tracks were written by Brookes, Blunt, R. Collins, Burgess; except where noted

7-inch
"Weirdo" – 3:38
"Theme from 'The Wish'" (Brookes, M. Collins, Blunt, R. Collins) – 3:31

12-inch
"Weirdo" – 3:38
"Theme from 'The Wish'" (Brookes, M. Collins, Blunt, R. Collins) – 3:31
"Sproston Green (US Version)" (Baker, Blunt, R. Collins, Burgess) – 6:01
"Weirdo (Alternate Take)" – 3:24

CD
"Weirdo" – 3:38
"Theme from 'The Wish'" (Brookes, M. Collins, Blunt, R. Collins) – 3:31
"Weirdo (Alternate Take)" – 3:24
"Sproston Green (US Version)" (Baker, Blunt, R. Collins, Burgess) – 6:01

Charts

See also
List of Billboard number-one alternative singles of the 1990s

References

1992 singles
1992 songs
Beggars Banquet Records singles
The Charlatans (English band) songs
Song recordings produced by Flood (producer)